These are the official results of the women's 4 × 400 metres relay event at the 1972 Summer Olympics in Munich, West Germany. The event was held on the 9 and 10 September 1972.  There were a total number of 14 nations competing.

Records
These were the standing World and Olympic records (in seconds) prior to the 1972 Summer Olympics.

Results

Final
Held on 10 September 1972

Semifinals
Held on 9 September 1972

Heat 1

Heat 2

References

External links
 Official Report
 Results

R
Relay foot races at the Olympics
1972 in women's athletics
Women's events at the 1972 Summer Olympics